is a national park in Okinawa Prefecture, Japan. It is located on and around the Yaeyama Islands of the East China Sea.

In August 2007 the protected area was extended to include Ishigaki Island.

The park is famous as the habitat of the Iriomote wild cat.

Related municipalities
 Ishigaki, Taketomi

See also
 List of national parks of Japan
 Okinawa Kaigan Quasi-National Park

References

External links
 
  Iriomote-Ishigaki National Park
  Iriomote-Ishigaki National Park
 Map of Iriomote-Ishigaki National Park

National parks of Japan
Parks and gardens in Okinawa Prefecture
Protected areas established in 1972
1972 establishments in Japan